The men's 4 × 10 kilometre relay cross-country skiing competition at the 2006 Winter Olympics in Turin, Italy, was held on 19 February at Pragelato.

A World Cup event in the relay was held at Beitostølen, Norway, on 20 November 2005, and Germany's team of Andreas Schlütter, Axel Teichmann, Jens Filbrich and Tobias Angerer won the competition. The defending World Champions were Norway, with a team of Odd-Bjørn Hjelmeset, Frode Estil, Lars Berger and Tore Ruud Hofstad. The Norwegians were also the defending Olympic champion, with Anders Aukland, Estil, Kristen Skjeldal and Thomas Alsgaard winning gold in Salt Lake. At Nagano in 1998, the Norwegians beat the Italians by less than one tenth of a second, and in 1994 at Lillehammer the Italians beat the Norwegians by less than one tenth of a second. In the previous three Olympics, the winning team beat the silver medalists by a cumulative time of just under one tenth of a second. One further relay event was held before the Olympics, at Val di Fiemme on 15 January 2006, which was won by an Italian team consisting of Giorgio Di Centa, Valerio Checchi, Pietro Piller Cottrer and Cristian Zorzi. Four teams finished within 2.6 seconds of the Italian winners.

Hosts Italy won this relay, their fifth straight medal in relays in the Winter Olympics. They were over 15 seconds ahead of any competitors. Sweden took bronze, their first medal since 1988, and Norway failed to win a medal for the first time since 1988.

Results
Each team used four skiers, with each completing racing over the same 10 kilometre circuit. The first two raced in the classical style, and the final pair of skiers raced freestyle. The Austrian team was disqualified after the IOC declared all four members permanently ineligible for doping-related violations.  This had a minimal effect on the final standings, as the Austrian team had been lapped during the race, ending up last overall.

The race was started at 10:00.

References

Men's cross-country skiing at the 2006 Winter Olympics
Men's 4 × 10 kilometre relay cross-country skiing at the Winter Olympics